Zselic National Landscape Protection Area (Hungarian language: Zselici Tájvédelmi Körzet [ˈʒɛlitsi ˈtaːjveːdɛlmi ˈkøɾzɛt]) is a dark-sky preserve in Hungary.
 It is located in the counties of Somogy and Baranya, between Kaposvár and Pécs, and whose boundary is managed by the Danube-Drava National Park. This includes some of the hills of Transdanubia, in the heart of the massif of Zselic.

References

Dark-sky preserves
Protected areas established in 1976
Protected areas of the Carpathians
Somogy County
Baranya County